The Apprentice Heel is a 1977 French comedy film directed by Michel Deville.

Cast
 Robert Lamoureux as Antoine Chapelot
 Christine Dejoux as Caroline Nattier
 Claude Piéplu as Etienne Forelon, le notaire de Briançon
 Jacques Doniol-Valcroze as L'adjoint au maire Forelon
 Jean-Pierre Kalfon as Robert Forelon, le directeur du journal
 Claude Marcault as La femme de l'adjoint
 Annick Blancheteau as La patronne de l'hôtel
 Jean-François Dérec as Joseph
 Bernard Lavalette as Roger Desmare

References

External links
 

1977 films
1977 comedy films
1970s French-language films
French comedy films
Films directed by Michel Deville
1970s French films